Mohapi Ntobo (born 7 May 1984) is a Mosotho footballer who currently plays as a defender for Matlama Maseru. He has won 10 caps for the Lesotho national football team since 2003.

External links
 

Association football defenders
Lesotho footballers
Lesotho international footballers
1984 births
Living people